Ilir Biturku (born 4 February 1968) is an Albanian retired footballer who is the current head coach of Albania U-20.

Playing career

Club
Biturku played most of his career as defender for Besa Kavajë and Partizani Tirana.

Managerial career
He also served as assistant manager of the Albania national under-17 football team. He was manager of Teuta in 2014 and later became technical director and assistant to Gentian Begeja. He was dismissed along with Begeja in June 2018. In December 2018 he was named head coach of the Albania national under-20 football team.

References

1968 births
Living people
Footballers from Kavajë
Albanian footballers
Association football defenders
Besa Kavajë players
FK Partizani Tirana players
Albanian football managers
Besa Kavajë managers
KF Teuta Durrës managers
Kategoria Superiore players
Kategoria Superiore managers